The Kawasaki KH-4 was a light utility helicopter produced in Japan in the 1960s as a development of the Bell 47 that Kawasaki had been building under licence since 1952. The most visible difference between the KH-4 and its forerunner was its new and enlarged cabin. This was fully enclosed (although the side doors were removable) and provided seating for three passengers side-by-side on a bench seat behind the pilot's seat. The helicopter was provided with a new control system, revised instrumentation, and larger fuel tank.

A total of 211 KH-4s were built, including four that were modified from existing Bell 47Gs. The vast majority of these were bought by civil operators, although some were purchased by the military forces of Japan and Thailand.

Operators
 
 Japan Ground Self-Defense Force - 14
 Japan Maritime Self-Defense Force
 Maritime Safety Agency - 6
 
 Thai Air Force

Specifications

See also

References

 
 

1960s Japanese civil utility aircraft
KH-4
1960s Japanese helicopters
Aircraft first flown in 1962
Single-engined piston helicopters